Herdsman (plural herdsmen) can refer to:

 Herder, a worker who lives a possibly semi-nomadic life, caring for various domestic animals
 Herdsman, Western Australia, a suburb of Perth
 Herdsman Lake, a groundwater lake located in Herdsman
 The Herdsman, a 1982 Chinese film by Xie Jin
 Stephen Herdsman (born 1975), American soccer defender